Western Railway Stadium is a multi purpose stadium in Bhavnagar, Saurashtra. The ground is mainly used for organizing matches of football, cricket and other sports.  The stadium has hosted three first-class matches  in 1962 when Saurashtra cricket team played against Maharashtra cricket team. The ground hosted four more first-class matches from 1967 to 1981 but since then the stadium has not hosted any matches.

References

External links 

 cricketarchive
 cricinfo

Cricket grounds in Gujarat
Sports venues in Saurashtra (region)
Cricket grounds in Saurashtra (region)
Defunct cricket grounds in India
Sports venues completed in 1962
1962 establishments in Gujarat
20th-century architecture in India